The Yugoslav Youth Football Cup was the most important youth football tournament in Yugoslavia.

Finals

References

Defunct football competitions in Yugoslavia
Yugoslav Cup
Youth football competitions